Nahr-e Khalaj (also Romanized as Nahr Khalaj; also known as Nahr Kalāch) is a village in Varzaq Rural District, in the Central District of Faridan County, Isfahan Province, Iran. At the 2006 census, its population was 2,584, in 639 families.

References 

Populated places in Faridan County